Kareika (also: Καράιικα - Karaiika) is a village and a community in the municipal unit of Movri, Achaea, Greece. The community consists of the villages Kareika, Gomosto, Karamesineika and Rachi. It is located north of the Movri hills, 3 km east of Sageika, 6 km southwest of Kato Achaia and 25 km southwest of Patras. The Greek National Road 9/E55 (Patras - Pyrgos) passes through the community.

Population

The population in 2011 by village:
Kareika, pop. 174
Gomosto, pop. 249
Karamesineika, pop. 158
Rachi, pop. 145

See also
List of settlements in Achaea

References

Populated places in Achaea